Canadian National Tug no. 5, or CN Tug no. 5, was a tugboat owned and operated by the Canadian National Railway (CNR) company on Okanagan Lake in British Columbia, Canada. She was launched on May 8, 1930 and was a steel tug that pushed railway barges to the Okanagan Landing shipyard and railway connection to transport fruit. By the 1950s and 1960s, CNR had three tugs: MV Pentowna, [[Canadian National Tug no. 6|CN Tug no. 6]], and CN Tug no. 5. Only one tug operated at a time, though two would be used in busy times, and each tug only pushed one barge. CNR's competitor on the lake, the Canadian Pacific Railway company, ran three tugs at a time, as well as many sternwheelers over the years, and each tug pushed two barges. Although the date of CN Tug no. 5's retirement is unknown, CNR terminated barge service on the lake in 1973, retiring its last ship, CN Tug no. 6'', due to the highways and other modes of transportation that had emerged by that time.

References

History of British Columbia
Culture of the Okanagan
1930 ships